Zénith An II is a live album by the French progressive rock band Ange. It was released in 2007.

Track listing
Disc One:
"Nonne Assistante À Personne À Tanger"  – 10:12
"Ethnies"  – 03:53
"Le Ballon De Billy"  – 07:42
"Adrénaline"  – 07:06
"Jusqu'où Iront-Ils"  – 08:49
"Culinaire Lingus"  – 05:38
"Virgule"  – 03:04
"Ode À Émile"  – 03:30
"Sur La Trace Des Fées"  – 05:08
"Au Delà Du Délire"  – 08:59
"Le Bal Des Laze"  – 07:11
Disc Two:
"Lola Bomembre - Sketch"  – 02:32
"On Sexe"  – 08:32
"Shéhérazade"  – 04:32
"Si J'étais Le Messie"  – 05:54
"Crever D'amour [Prélude]"  – 03:12
"Cadavres Exquis"  – 12:18
"Présentation"  – 03:53
"Docteur Man"  – 04:00
"Vu D'un Chien"  – 08:14
"Ces Gens-Là"  – 06:35
"Autour D'un Cadavre Exquis"  – 11:19

Personnel
Lead Vocals, Acoustic Guitar, Keyboards: Christian Decamps
Vocals: Caroline Crozat
Keyboards, Backing Vocals: Tristan Decamps
Guitar, Backing Vocals: Hassan Hajdi
Bass, Backing Vocals: Thierry Sidhoum
Drums, Percussion: Hervé Rouyer

Additional Musicians
Presentation: Chraz
Violin, on "Adrénaline": Gilles Pequinot
Recorder, Gimbarde on "On sexe": Gilles Pequinot
Acoustic Guitar on "Virgule", Guitar on "Autour D'un Cadavre Exquis": Claude Demet
Bass on "Ode À Émile", "Sur La Trace Des Fées", "Au Delà Du Délire": Daniel Haas
Drums on "Ode À Émile", "Sur La Trace Des Fées", Percussion on "Au Delà Du Délire": Guénolé Biger
Vocals on "Shéhérazade": Francis Lalanne
Vocals, Guitar on "Si J'étais Le Messie": Jean-Marc Miro
Tablas on "Si J'étais Le Messie": Manu
Guitar on "Vu D'un Chien", "Autour D'un Cadavre Exquis": Serge Cuenot
Guitar on "Autour D'un Cadavre Exquis": Jean-Pascal Boffo
Guitar on "Autour D'un Cadavre Exquis": Norbert Krief
Painting: Juan Ramirez

References
Zénith An II on ange-updlm 
Zénith An II on www.amarokprog.net

Ange albums
2007 live albums